Appleton Thorn is a village in the borough of Warrington in Cheshire, England.

Appleton appeared in the Domesday survey as Epeltune, meaning "the tun where the apples grew".

Bawming the Thorn 
Each June, the village hosts the ceremony of "Bawming the Thorn". The current form of the ceremony dates from the 19th century, when it was part of the village's "walking day". It involved children from Appleton Thorn Primary School walking through the village and holding sports and games at the school. This now takes place at the village hall. The ceremony stopped in the 1930s, but was revived by the then headmaster, Mr Bob Jones in the early 1970s. "Bawming the Thorn" occurs on the Saturday nearest to Midsummer's Day.
 Local schoolchildren dance around the tree in the style of a maypole chanting verses to the tune of Bonnie Dundee, with the following repeated chorus:
Bawming means "decorating" – during the ceremony the thorn tree is decorated  with ribbons and garlands. According to legend, the hawthorn at Appleton Thorn grew from a cutting of the Holy Thorn at Glastonbury, which was itself said to have sprung from the staff of Joseph of Arimathea, the man who arranged for Jesus's burial after the crucifixion.

Famous places 
Thorn Cross (HM Prison) is in Appleton Thorn, on the site formerly occupied by Royal Naval Air Station HMS Blackcap, a wartime aircrew training and aircraft repair airfield. There are a number of graves of aircrew who died at HMS Blackcap, mainly in flying accidents, in St Cross churchyard, known locally as "the war graves".

Administration 
Appleton Thorn falls under the Warrington Borough ward of Grappenhall, and the UK House of Commons constituency of Warrington South, whose MP since 2019 is Andy Carter of the Conservative Party.

See also 

Listed buildings in Appleton, Cheshire

References 

Notes

Bibliography

Warrington
Villages in Cheshire